Pentenes (also called Pentylenes) are alkenes with the chemical formula . Each contains one double bond within its molecular structure. Six different compounds are in this class, differing from each other by whether the carbon atoms are attached linearly or in a branched structure, and whether the double bond has a cis or trans form.

Straight-chain isomers
1-Pentene is an alpha-olefin. Most often, 1-pentene is made as a byproduct of catalytic or thermal cracking of petroleum, or during production of ethylene and propylene via thermal cracking of hydrocarbon fractions. 

The only commercial manufacturer of 1-pentene is Sasol Ltd, where it is separated from crude made by the Fischer–Tropsch process.

2-Pentene has two geometric isomers, cis-2-pentene and trans-2-pentene. Cis-2-Pentene is used in olefin metathesis.

Branched-chain isomers
The branched isomers are 2-methylbut-1-ene, 3-methylbut-1-ene (isopentene), and 2-methylbut-2-ene (isoamylene).

Isoamylene is one of three main byproducts of deep catalytic cracking (DCC), which is very similar to the operation of the fluid catalytic cracking (FCC). The DCC uses vacuum gas oil (VGO) as a feedstock to produce primarily propylene, isobutylene, and isoamylene. The rise in demand for polypropylene has encouraged the growth of the DCC, which is operated very much like FCC. Isobutylene and isoamylene feedstocks are necessary for the production of the much debated gasoline blending components methyl tert-butyl ether and tert-amyl methyl ether.

Production of fuels
Propylene, isobutene, and amylenes are feedstock in alkylation units of refineries.  Using isobutane, blendstocks are generated with high branching for good combustion characteristics.  Amylenes are valued as precursors to fuels, especially aviation fuels of relatively low volatility, as required by various regulations.

References

Alkenes